"Tal Vez" is a song recorded by Puerto Rican singer Ricky Martin for his seventh studio album, Almas del Silencio (2003). The song was written by Venezuelan singer-songwriter Franco De Vita, while the production was handled by Tommy Torres. It was released to radio stations by Sony Discos as the lead single from the album on March 25, 2003. A Spanish language rock ballad, it is a romantic song about regret, lost opportunities, and last chances. The song received widely positive reviews from music critics, who complimented its melody, lyrics, and Martin's vocals. It was ranked as one of the Top Latin Songs of the Century by Latin Times.

"Tal Vez" was nominated for Song of the Year at the 4th Annual Latin Grammy Awards and won the awards for Hot Latin Song of the Year and Latin Pop Airplay Track of the Year, Male at the 2004 Latin Billboard Music Awards. The song was commercially successful, reaching number one in Argentina, Chile, Central America, Mexico and Venezuela, as well as Billboards Hot Latin Tracks, Latin Pop Airplay, and Tropical Airplay charts in the United States. It spent a total of 11 non-consecutive weeks atop the Hot Latin Tracks chart, surpassing "Livin' la Vida Loca" as Martin's longest number-one single on the chart, and was the longest-running number one of 2003.

The accompanying music video was filmed in La Boca near Buenos Aires, and directed by Kacho López and Carlos Pérez. It depicts the daily life of the residents of a building, including the singer. To promote the song, Martin performed it at the 2003 Latin Billboard Music Awards. The track was also included on the set lists for the One Night Only with Ricky Martin tour, the Black and White Tour, the Live in Mexico tour, the One World Tour, and the Ricky Martin en Concierto.

Background and release
Ricky Martin released his fifth studio album and English-language debut, Ricky Martin in 1999, which became his biggest commercial success, selling over 15 million copies worldwide. It was followed by another English album, Sound Loaded in 2000. He initially planned to release the third English-language album as his seventh studio album, which was supposed to be his first album in which he wrote or co-wrote all songs. Despite Martin and Sony Music Entertainment's original plan, he decided to release a Spanish-language album:

He finished working on the album on March 8, 2003. Two days later, his then manager Angelo Medina talked about the album in an interview with El Nuevo Día. He revealed the album's title as Almas del Silencio, mentioning that it has been set for release in May. "Tal Vez" was released to radio stations as the lead single from the album on March 25, 2003. In Mexico, it was launched as a promotional CD single on the same date. Medina explained to Billboard that they asked Venezuelan singer-songwriter Franco De Vita to write the song, since "he's a composer that knows Ricky well; they have a connection". De Vita had previously composed Martin's 1998 song "Vuelve". "Tal Vez" was included as the second track on Martin's seventh studio album, Almas del Silencio, released May 20, 2003. The track was also later added to Martin's compilation albums 17 (2008), Personalidad (2015), and Esencial (2018). A salsa version of the song was recorded and was later included on the compilation album Baladas en Salsa (2004).

Music and lyrics

Musically, "Tal Vez" is a Spanish language rock ballad with a piano and string instruments. The track was produced by Puerto Rican musician Tommy Torres and runs for a total of 4 minutes and 39 seconds. According to the song's sheet music on Musicnotes.com, "Tal Vez" is composed in the key of B major with a groove of 58 beats per minute. Martin's vocals span from the low note of D4 to the high note of G5. Lyrically, "Tal Vez", which translates to "Perhaps" in English, is a romantic song about regret and is an "aching reflection on lost opportunities and last chances", according to the Los Angeles Times. The lyrics include, "Tal vez nunca te he dado lo que tu esperabas / Y no estaba cuando me necesitabas / Tal vez no te escuché / Tal vez me descuide / Tal vez se me olvido que yo te amaba" (Maybe I've never given you what you expected / And I wasn't there when you needed me / Maybe I didn't listen to you / Maybe I neglected you / Maybe I forgot that I loved you).

Critical reception
"Tal Vez" was met with widely positive reviews from music critics. Leila Cobo from Billboard described its melody as "soaring" and "catchy", explaining its lyrics as "simple - yet not simplistic". She also complimented Martin's vocals for being "raspier and more earnest than on past albums". An author of Daily News labeled it "a classy romantic ballad", and Miami Heralds Jordan Levin named it "a soaring ballad". An author of Radio Cooperativa described it as Martin's "most intense ballad". Writing for the El Paso Times, Melissa Martinez noted its similarity with previous ballads and stated: "The heartache just seeps through each word and leaves you wanting to reach out and make it all better." Mario Tarradell of The Herald-News gave the song a positive review, saying it is "an undeniable hit, a sweeping ballad that never turns cloying". An editor for El Tiempo likened Martin recording the salsa version of the song to trying on a different shirt size. Carlos Mario Castro from El Sabanero X named "Tal Vez" Martin's third-best song, mentioning that it "undoubtedly rescues the values inherent in the singer's Puerto Rican origin", following his crossover to English. In 2015, Univision staff ranked the track as Martin's eighth-best ballad, while Claudia González Alvarado from Chilango ranked it as his seventh-best ballad in 2021, naming it one of Martin's "most classic songs". MTV Argentina also ranked it as one of his best songs in 2020. In his review for Vogue in 2021, Esteban Villaseñor ranked the song among Martin's most popular songs.

Accolades
In 2013, Latin Times ranked "Tal Vez" at number 15 on their list of "The Top 35 Latin Songs of the Century". The song has received a number of awards and nominations. It was nominated for Song of the Year at the 4th Annual Latin Grammy Awards, but lost to "Es Por Ti" by Juanes. It won the award for Best Song at the 2003 Premios Tu Música. At the 2004 Latin Billboard Music Awards, "Tal Vez" won the awards for Hot Latin Song of the Year and Latin Pop Airplay Track of the Year, Male. The track was also nominated for Pop Song of the Year at the 2004 Lo Nuestro Awards. It was honored as Latin Song of the Year at the 2004 ASCAP Latin Awards.

Commercial performance
"Tal Vez" is one of Martin's most commercially successful songs in his career. In the United States, it debuted at number one on the Billboard Hot Latin Tracks chart on the week of April 12, 2003, marking the first number one debut since February 7, 1998, and becoming the sixth song overall in the chart's history to do so. It spent a total of 11 non-consecutive weeks at this position, surpassing "Livin' la Vida Loca" as Martin's longest number-one single on the chart, and was the longest-running number one of 2003. "Tal Vez" also debuted at the top of the Latin Pop Airplay chart, where it spent thirteen weeks at this position, tying with "Tu Recuerdo" as his longest-running number song on the chart. In addition, it topped the Tropical Airplay chart. On the year-end charts, it was the best-performing Latin song and Latin pop song of the year in the US. The song also peaked at numbers 74 and 73 on the US Billboard Hot 100 and Hot 100 Airplay charts, respectively. Besides the United States, the song reached number one in multiple Latin American markets. It topped the charts in Argentina, Chile, Central America, Mexico and Venezuela.

Promotion

Music video

On March 31, 2003, La Nación revealed that Martin began filming a music video for "Tal Vez". The video was filmed in a factory in La Boca, a barrio of Buenos Aires, Argentina, the same setting where the video for his hit "María" was set. It was produced by Paradiso Films under the direction of Kacho López and Carlos Pérez. The visual was aired on April 24, 2003, on Telemundo. The video depicts the daily life of the residents of a building, including Martin.  According to El Universal, López managed to capture a real story about universal love, addressing the song's lyrics in the music video. The video won the award for Video of the Year at the 2003 Premios de la Gente. Cristal Mesa from mitú ranked "Tal Vez" as Martin's tenth best music video on her 2018 list, and an author of Cultura Colectiva listed it among the "13 Videos to Appreciate Ricky Martin's Talent and Sickening Good Looks". The video was uploaded on the singer's YouTube channel on October 3, 2009, but was made unavailable after receiving 27.5 million views. A remastered version of the video was also uploaded on Martin's YouTube channel on the same date, which has received over 65 million views, as of November 2021.

Live performances
Martin describes "Tal Vez" as a song he will "never stop singing". He gave his first live performance of the song at the 2003 Latin Billboard Music Awards on May 8, 2003. The track was included on the set lists for Martin's the One Night Only with Ricky Martin tour, the Black and White Tour, the Live in Mexico tour, the One World Tour, and the Ricky Martin en Concierto. He also performed the song along with his other hits during the 48th, 55th, and 61st editions of the Viña del Mar International Song Festival in 2007, 2014, and 2020, respectively.

Formats and track listings

Australian promotional CD single
 "Tal Vez" (Radio Edit) – 4:21
 Special Greeting – 0:13
European promotional CD single
 "Tal Vez" (Album Version) – 4:41

US / Latin American promotional CD single
 "Tal Vez" (Radio Edit) – 4:15
US promotional CD single
 "Tal Vez" (salsa version) – 4:07

Credits and personnel
Credits adapted from Tidal and the US promotional CD single liner notes.

Studio locations
 Recorded at – Dharmik Studio, Bogart Recording (Miami, Florida), EQ's Studio (Miami, Florida), Capitol Studios (Hollywood, California), Sound Stage Studios (Nashville, Tennessee), and Diginote Studios (Miami, Florida)
 Mixed At – Mix This! (Los Angeles, California)
 Mastered At – Sterling Sound (Nashville, Tennessee)

Personnel

 Ricky Martin vocal, associated performer, background vocal
 Franco De Vita composer, lyricist
 Tommy Torres producer, arranger, background vocal, tambourine
 Dan Warner acoustic guitar, electric guitar
 David Campbell arranger
 Kevin Harp assistant engineer
 Tobin Reinfried assistant engineer
 Jamey Soule assistant engineer
 Alex Al bass
 Rudy Stein cello
 Steve Richards cello
 Larry Corbett cello
 Suzie Katayama cello
 Lee Levin drums
 Ted Jensen mastering engineer
 Bob Clearmountain mixing engineer
 Matt Rollings piano
 Chuck Ainlay recording engineer
 Bob St. John recording engineer
 Charles Dye recording engineer
 Richie Pérez recording engineer
 Steve Churchyard recording engineer
 Matt Funes viola
 John Hayhurst viola
 Jorge Moraga viola
 Bob Becker viola
 Joel Derouin violin
 Endre Granat violin
 Bruce Dukov violin
 Charlie Bisharat violin
 Ken Yerke violin
 Mark Robertson violin
 Peter Kent violin
 Natalie Leggett violin
 Sara Parkins violin
 Susan Chatman violin
 Mario DeLeon violin
 Michele Richards violin
 Gerardo Hilera violin
 Eve Butler violin
 Berj Garabedian violin
 Darius Campo violin

Charts

Weekly charts

Year-end charts

All-time charts

Release history

See also

 2003 in Latin music
 Billboard Hot Latin Songs Year-End Chart
 List of Latin songs on the Billboard Hot 100
 List of number-one Billboard Hot Latin Tracks of 2003
 List of number-one Billboard Latin Pop Airplay songs of 2003
 List of number-one Billboard Hot Tropical Songs of 2003

References

2003 singles
2003 songs
Ricky Martin songs
2000s ballads
Rock ballads
Songs written by Franco De Vita
Spanish-language songs
Sony Discos singles
Columbia Records singles